Cnemodinus is a genus of darkling beetles in the family Tenebrionidae. There are at least three described species in Cnemodinus. It is the only genus in the monotypic tribe Cnemodinini.

Species
These species belong to the genus Cnemodinus:
 Cnemodinus angustus Casey, 1907
 Cnemodinus subhyalinus Casey, 1907
 Cnemodinus testaceus  (Horn, 1870)

References

Tenebrionoidea